"I Know Who You Are" is a song by Australian contemporary worship band Planetshakers. It was released on May 11, 2016, as the single from their live album, Overflow: Live (2016). The song was written by Mitch Wong. It appeared on the EP Momentum (Live in Manila) and also the Spanish album Sé Quién Eres Tú.

Background
"I Know Who You Are" was written by Mitch Wong and produced by Ian Eskelin, has been available from May 11, 2016 on all streaming and digital retail platforms and added on AC and radio CHR. After adding the song to the radio it reached No. 30 on the Billboard Hot Christian Songs chart.

Music videos
The official music video for the song was released on September 28, 2016 and has garnered over 410 thousand views as of January 2021.

Charts

Release history

References

2016 singles
2016 songs
Christian songs
Gospel songs
Contemporary Christian songs
Planetshakers songs
Planetshakers Ministries International singles